Joseph Silver Collings (11 May 1865 – 20 June 1955) was a long-serving Australian politician. He was a hardworking Australian Labor Party bureaucrat with valuable writing and speaking talents, who was eventually rewarded by a five-year stint as a federal government minister.

Early life

Collings was born in Brighton, England and educated at Brighton Board School and by his parents.  He reported for the Sussex Daily News before emigrating with his parents to Brisbane when he was 18.  He worked as a farm labourer, failed as a selector and, in 1885, married Kate McInerney.  He found work in the footwear industry and was at one time secretary of the Queensland Boot and Shoe Manufacturers' Association.  He worked with "scabs" during a strike in 1895 and was ostracised by the Australian Boot Trade Employees' Federation although he worked hard for the labour movement.  His support for the 1912 Brisbane general strike led to him being forgiven by the unions and he subsequently established the Federated Clerks' Union in Queensland.

Political career
Collings unsuccessfully contested elections to the Legislative Assembly of Queensland in 1908, 1909, and 1915, but was elected to Balmoral Shire Council from 1910 to 1913.  He attended Labor Party conventions from 1905 and was elected to the Queensland central executive of the party between 1913 and 1928.  From 1914 to 1915 and 1919 to 1931 he was an organiser for the party.  In 1916 he campaigned vigorously against conscription in Queensland and Victoria.  He was appointed to the Queensland Legislative Council in 1920 and took part in the successful vote to abolish it in 1922. In 1931 he was organising secretary for the provisional state executive set up by the federal party to replace the expelled Lang Labor executive.

Collings was elected the Australian Senate in 1931 and became Leader of the Opposition in the Senate in 1935 and Leader of the Government in the Senate with the coming to power of the Curtin government in October 1941.  At the same time he became Minister for the Interior, a position he held until July 1945, when he became Vice-President of the Executive Council, a position he held until November 1946.  He did not contest the 1949 election and retired from the Senate in June 1950.

Along with Gordon Brown, Collings was joint Father of the Senate from 1947 to 1950. Collings, at 85 years of age, remains the oldest person to have served in the Senate.

Later life
After retiring, Collings and settled in the Brisbane seaside suburb of Brighton.

Collings died at his home, 694 Flinders Parade, Brighton on 20 June 1955, survived by one son(Eric) and one daughter of his six children. He was accorded a state funeral and cremated.

References

External links

 
 

Australian Labor Party members of the Parliament of Australia
Members of the Australian Senate for Queensland
Members of the Australian Senate
Members of the Cabinet of Australia
1865 births
1955 deaths
Members of the Queensland Legislative Council
Australian trade unionists
People from Brighton
20th-century Australian politicians